Henrique Avancini (born 30 March 1989) is a Brazilian mountain bike racer. He rode at the cross-country event at the 2016 Summer Olympics. Partnered with German rider Manuel Fumic at the 2016 and 2017 Absa Cape Epic, he won the prologue time trial and stage 1 in 2017, and the stage 7 finale in 2016.

He represented Brazil at the 2020 Summer Olympics.

Major results

2013
 1st  Cross-country, National Championships
 3rd  Cross-country, Pan American Championships
2014
 1st  Cross-country, South American Games
 2nd Cross-country, National Championships
2015
 1st  Cross-country, Pan American Championships
 1st  Cross-country, National Championships
 2nd Overall Cyprus Sunshine Cup
2016
 1st  Cross-country, National Championships
 1st Stage 7 Cape Epic
 2nd  Cross-country, Pan American Championships
2017
 Cape Epic
1st Prologue & Stage 1
 2nd  Cross-country, Pan American Championships
 2nd Cross-country, National Championships
2018
 1st  Marathon, UCI World Championships
 1st  Cross-country, National Championships
 UCI XCC World Cup
1st Vallnord
 3rd Overall Cape Epic (with Manuel Fumic)
1st Stages 1 & 2
2019
 1st  Cross-country, National Championships
 1st  Marathon, National Championships
 2nd Overall Cape Epic (with Manuel Fumic)
1st Stage 3
 3rd Overall UCI XCO World Cup
3rd Nové Město
3rd Vallnord
3rd Les Gets
 UCI XCC World Cup
1st Vallnord
2nd Les Gets
2020
 National Championships
1st  Cross-country
1st  Short track
 1st Overall UCI Ranking MTB XCO
 UCI XCO World Cup
1st Nové Město II
 UCI XCC World Cup
1st Nové Město II
 1st Copa Catalana Internacional BTT
 1st Strabag Czech MTB Cup
 1st Górale na Start
2021
 National Championships
1st  Cross-country
1st  Short track
 UCI XCC World Cup
1st Lenzerheide
2nd Snowshoe
 Internazionali d’Italia Series
1st Capoliveri
 2nd  Short track, UCI World Championships
2022
 Pan American Championships
1st  Cross-country
2nd  Short track
 National Championships
1st  Cross-country
1st  Short track
 1st Taça Brasil
 1st Internacional Estrada Real
 1st Brasil Ride Bahia - Stage Class 1

References

External links

1989 births
Living people
Brazilian male cyclists
Brazilian mountain bikers
Cross-country mountain bikers
Cyclists at the 2016 Summer Olympics
Olympic cyclists of Brazil
Cape Epic cyclists
Pan American Games medalists in cycling
Pan American Games silver medalists for Brazil
Cyclists at the 2019 Pan American Games
Medalists at the 2019 Pan American Games
UCI Mountain Bike World Champions (men)
Cyclists at the 2020 Summer Olympics
People from Petrópolis
Sportspeople from Rio de Janeiro (state)
20th-century Brazilian people
21st-century Brazilian people